Kamel Fathi Ghilas (born 9 March 1984) is an Algerian former professional footballer who played as a forward.

Club career

Early years
Born in Marseille, France, Ghilas started his career in amateur football, with ES Vitrolles. At the age of 19 he joined AS Cannes in the Championnat National, quickly breaking into the first team and featuring mostly as a winger.

Ghilas established himself as a starter in the 2004–05 season, going on to lead the team in scoring by netting seven times in 31 appearances. The following year he contributed with 13 as the French Riviera club narrowly missed out on promotion to Ligue 2, finishing two points behind FC Libourne-Saint-Seurin for the third and final spot.

Vitória Guimarães
Ghilas signed for Vitória S.C. from Portugal in the summer of 2006, penning a two-year contract. In his first year he ranked first in goals scored in his team, helping to a return to the Primeira Liga after one year out.

Ghilas made his debut in the competition on 19 August 2007, starting in a 1–1 home draw against Vitória de Setúbal. He scored six times in a further 20 league appearances to help the side finish a best-ever third and qualify to the UEFA Champions League; however, following a contract dispute, he left the Minho Province club as a free agent.

Celta
On 12 July 2008, RC Celta de Vigo announced the signing of Ghilas from Vitória, with the player penning a three-year contract worth €300,000 a year. He scored his first goals for the Galicians on 28 September in a 2–1 home win over CD Tenerife, in what was the season's first win.

On 28 July 2009, a fee of £1.7 million was agreed for Ghilas to transfer to Blackburn Rovers in the Premier League – the move was set to be completed pending on the player agreeing personal terms and passing a medical. However, the transfer broke down in the 11th hour, with conflicting reports on the grounds: the English claimed he had failed the medical, whereas the Spaniards claimed that Blackburn had attempted to renegotiate the transfer fee and player's wages at the last minute; they attempted to disprove Rovers' claims by playing him in a friendly the following day.

Hull City
On 13 August 2009, Ghilas agreed terms with Hull City, signing a four-year deal for which Celta was paid roughly £2 million. He made his debut for his new team nine days later, scoring in a 1–0 victory over Bolton Wanderers in the 61st minute after being fed a through ball from Jozy Altidore.

However, Ghilas failed to perform for the East Yorkshire side subsequently, being loaned to French clubs AC Arles-Avignon and Stade de Reims. He made his debut for the latter on 15 August 2011, netting in a 2–1 win over AS Monaco FC.

Late career

After scoring 14 goals in the 2011–12 campaign, being an essential offensive unit as Reims returned to Ligue 1 after more than three decades, Ghilas joined the club on a permanent deal. On 30 January 2014, he moved teams and countries again, joining Belgian Pro League's R. Charleroi S.C. for six months.

International career
Although French-born, Ghilas opted to represent Algeria, making his international debut on 2 June 2007 in an 2008 Africa Cup of Nations qualifier against Cape Verde. Five months later he scored his first goal, in a 3–2 friendly win over Mali.

Personal life
Ghilas' younger brother, Nabil, was also a footballer and a forward. He too played in France, Portugal and for Algeria.

Career statistics

Club

International

|}

References

External links

1984 births
Living people
Kabyle people
French sportspeople of Algerian descent
French people of Kabyle descent
Footballers from Marseille
Algerian footballers
French footballers
Association football forwards
Ligue 1 players
Ligue 2 players
Championnat National players
AS Cannes players
AC Arlésien players
Stade de Reims players
Primeira Liga players
Liga Portugal 2 players
Vitória S.C. players
Segunda División players
RC Celta de Vigo players
Premier League players
Hull City A.F.C. players
Belgian Pro League players
R. Charleroi S.C. players
Algeria international footballers
Algerian expatriate footballers
French expatriate footballers
Expatriate footballers in Portugal
Expatriate footballers in Spain
Expatriate footballers in England
Expatriate footballers in Belgium
Algerian expatriate sportspeople in Portugal
Algerian expatriate sportspeople in Spain
Algerian expatriate sportspeople in England
Algerian expatriate sportspeople in Belgium